The Newsie and the Lady is a 1938 Argentine comedy film directed and written by Luis César Amadori.

Cast
 Luis Sandrini
 Rosita Moreno
 Lalo Bouhier
 Sara Olmos
 Miguel Gómez Bao
 Juan Mangiante
 Armando de Vicente
 Eduardo Sandrini
 Aurelia Ferrer
 María Esther Buschiazzo

Reception
La Nación commented on the film stating: "It is not inspired by the environment we know but by that of those frothy American films which so frivolously take us to a world of millionaires... borne on the wings of Frank Capra." In his biography of Amadori in the collection "Los directores del cine argentino" (Argentine Cinema Directors), Claudio España comments: "A modern comedy with a predictable ending and an old theme but with much narrative freshness." For their part, Manrupe and Portela write: "A good Sandrini from the early days when he knew what he could do best, enhanced by the director when they first worked together."

References

External links

1938 films
1930s Spanish-language films
Argentine black-and-white films
Films directed by Luis César Amadori
Argentine comedy films
1938 comedy films
1930s Argentine films